The Greenland national badminton team is a badminton team located in Greenland, Denmark and represents the nation of Greenland in international badminton team competitions. It is controlled by the Greenland Badminton Federation, the governing body for badminton in Greenland.

Despite badminton not being popular in Greenland, the team has once participated in the Sudirman Cup, which was in 2019. Greenland has also recently been participating in the European Men's and Women's Team Badminton Championships. The team participates under Danish influence.

Participation in BWF competitions
Greenland has only participated once in international BWF team tournaments and that was the 2019 Sudirman Cup. The Greenlandic team was placed into the Group 4 along with Kazakhstan and Macau. The team lost both group ties but won one match when Sara Lindskov Jacobsen beat Kazakhstan's Aisha Zhumabek. The team finished in 31st place on the rankings.

Sudirman Cup

Participation in European Team Badminton Championships

Men's Team

Women's Team

Participation in Island Games 
The Greenlandic badminton team participates in the biennial Island Games. The mixed team lost the quarterfinals tie twice in 2015 and 2019. The team finally won gold in 2019 after defeating defending champions Guernsey.

Mixed team

Current squad 
The following players were selected to represent Greenland at the 2018 European Men's and Women's Team Badminton Championships.

Male players
Toke Ketwa-Driefer
Bror Madsen
Jens-Frederik Nielsen
Taatsiannguaq Pedersen

Female players
Milka Brønlund
Nina Høegh
Sara Lindskov Jacobsen
Celia Villebro Rasmussen

References

Badminton
National badminton teams
Badminton in Greenland